Rovt is a dispersed settlement in the hills west of Polhov Gradec in the Municipality of Dobrova–Polhov Gradec in the Upper Carniola region of Slovenia.

Name
The name Rovt is derived from the common noun rovt 'glade, clearing', referring to a meadow on cleared land in a hilly area. The Slovene word rovt is derived from Old High German rût 'clearing'. Like other places with similar names (e.g., Rovte, Rut), this name refers to a local geographical feature.

References

External links

Rovt on Geopedia

Populated places in the Municipality of Dobrova-Polhov Gradec